Empress Xiaoyuanzhen (1580–1613), of the Guo clan, was the first wife of the Taichang Emperor when he was crown prince. She died before he ascended the throne, but is more commonly known by her posthumous name.

Biography
Lady Guo was selected as concubine to the crown prince, Zhu Changluo, in 1601.Her father, Guo Weicheng, was enfeoffed as Count of Boping as a result of her status, and later raised to the rank of marquis. She died in 1613.

Titles 
During the reign of the Wanli Emperor (r. 1572–1620):
Lady Guo (郭氏; from 1580)
Crown Princess (太子妃; from 1601)
Crown Princess Gongjing (恭靖太子妃; from 1613)
During the reign of the Tianqi Emperor (r. 1621–1627):
Empress Xiàoyuán Zhāoyì Zhéhuì Zhuāngrén Hétiān Bìshèng Zhēn (孝元昭懿哲惠莊仁合天弼聖貞皇后; from 1621)

Issue
As Crown Princess:
Princess Daoyi of Huaishu (懷淑悼懿公主; 1604–1610), personal name Huijian (徽娟), the Taichang Emperor's second daughter

Burial

Lady Guo died while her husband was still crown prince, and her burial with the accoutrements and rituals of an imperial crown prince's concubine was prevented by her father-in-law, the Wanli Emperor. It was not until an assassination attempt against Zhu Changluo in 1615, allegedly orchestrated by his father's favourite concubine Noble Consort Zheng, that popular opinion forced the emperor to acknowledge his eldest son and grant Lady Guo a proper burial. At this time, she was granted the posthumous name of Crown Princess Gongjing. When the Tianqi Emperor, her husband's son by a concubine, ascended the throne, he granted her the posthumous title of Empress and had her remains moved to the Ming tombs, where she was buried alongside the short-lived Taichang Emperor and included in the family shrine.

References

Notes

Works cited

1580 births
1613 deaths
16th-century Chinese women
16th-century Chinese people
17th-century Chinese women
17th-century Chinese people
Ming dynasty posthumous empresses
People from Beijing